Silvermine is an unincorporated community in Fairfield County, Connecticut, United States that extends across three southwestern Connecticut towns: Norwalk, New Canaan and Wilton.

The name "Silvermine" comes from old legends of a silver mine in the area, although no silver has ever been found.  Silvermine was long an art colony and remains the home of the Silvermine Guild Arts Center. The Silvermine Tavern, an inn occupying several historic buildings, also remains in the neighborhood. Silver Hill Hospital is just beyond the northern end of the neighborhood, in New Canaan near the Wilton border. There are two community groups specific to Silvermine: The Silvermine Community Association and the Norwalk Association of Silvermine Homeowners (NASH).

History

The area has been settled since at least the late seventeenth century. In the eighteenth century, the Silvermine River was used for 12 or 13 mills in the neighborhood because it fell steeply enough for the water power to be profitably harnessed. The mills included a leather tanning works, sawmill, and spool works.

Solon Borglum, a sculptor, moved to the New Canaan part of Silvermine in 1906 and built a hillside studio. He was one of the leading figures in an emerging community of artists in the neighborhood and helped found the "Knockers Club" – so named because when they would meet in Borglum's studio and discuss their art, a lot of frank criticism came out, knocking one another's work – that later became the Silvermine Guild, one of the largest and oldest art centers in New England. Other artists in the neighborhood included George Avison, D. Putnam Brinley, John Cassell, Richard Daggy, Leo Dorn, R. B. Gruelle, Bernhard Gutmann, Hamilton Hamilton, Howard Hildebrandt, Cornelia Ellis Hildebrandt, Frank Townsend Hutchens, Adele Klaer, E. Murray MacKay, Clifton Meek, Addison T. Millar, Sam Otis and Carl Schmitt. The Guild operated the Silvermine College of Art, an accredited two-year educational institution, for ten years starting in 1962.

In 1899, the present Perry Avenue Bridge was constructed. The one-lane stone bridge carries the road over Silvermine River near the Silvermine Tavern grist mill. In the flood of 1955, water flowed over the bridge. The span was put on the National Register of Historic Places in October 2006. That year one of the bridge's curbstones fell into the water, and for the six months before Memorial Day weekend in 2008 the span was closed as repairs were made. The bridge is so narrow that when at times when cars try to pass another, curbstones can be hit. The Norwalk city government spent $350,000 in repairs, which included masonry restoration, new railings, repaving and further narrowing so that drivers would not be tempted to try to pass. A parade with antique cars was held to celebrate the reopening of the bridge.

Silvermine Tavern
The Silvermine Tavern, a restaurant and inn with 11 overnight rooms, is a group of historic buildings overlooking the mill falls on the Silvermine River. The grist mill building, constructed in the seventeenth century, is the oldest of the four structures, which also include the tavern building, the coach house and the country store.

The tavern has operated since 1929 when John Byard started running it there. In 1948 the tavern changed hands and was run by I.M. Weiss until it passed on to the Whitman family. Frank and Marsha Whitman took over the tavern in 1973. In 2007 they announced they were selling it, with an asking price of $4.5 million. The Whitmans notified their patrons about the sale with letters to longtime, loyal customers in an attempt to find a buyer who values the traditions of the local institution, although the marketing was also going beyond that group to restaurateurs in Fairfield County and New York City. The business has 35 employees.

The president of the Connecticut Restaurant Association said in early 2007 that the tavern is a venerable institution, with loyal patrons who would not want dramatic changes to it. Brian Griffin, vice president of the Greater Norwalk Chamber of Commerce, called the business "one of the true New England taverns that we have left in the area, and it's absolutely a part of the neighborhood."

Aside from being a restaurant, Silvermine Tavern was a popular place for weddings and wedding receptions, as well as other private functions.  It was also well known in the community for their Sunday Brunch.

Actor Spencer Tracy frequently stayed in Silvermine and purportedly "holds the record for eating the most waffles at one sitting" at the old Grist Mill, when that building was a waffle shop in the 1930s. In more recent years the restaurant's honey buns were a popular tradition.

The Silvermine Tavern closed on February 22, 2009, and subsequently the property was placed on the market for sale.  The business re-opened for inn customers in 2010, but the restaurant remained closed to the general public.  In 2012, the entire property was again placed on the market for sale.

National Register of Historic Places listings 
In 2003, the Norwalk Association of Silvermine Homeowners (NASH) began a campaign to get the neighborhood recognized on the National Register of Historic Places. For years, the association wanted the entire neighborhood designated, but because of newer construction, the original proposal was broken up into several smaller sections. The group raised $13,000 on its own and, on June 26, 2006, the State Historic Preservation Office granted $7,000 to study the "core" area of the neighborhood in order to draw up a proposal. State Sen. Bob Duff, a Norwalk Democrat, helped get increased state funding for the State Historic Preservation Office which gave out the grant to the community. Duff told a local newspaper that four generations of his family have lived in the neighborhood.

The core area consists of Silvermine Tavern and 85 other historic buildings, about half of which are in Norwalk, with the rest in New Canaan, except for one in Wilton. The core area was listed in the National Register of Historic Places as a historic district, known as Silvermine Center Historic District, on June 23, 2009. NASH has initiated the development of applications for two additional possible historic districts, the Silvermine Avenue Historic District and the Perry Avenue Historic District.

The Perry Avenue Bridge in the neighborhood, built in 1899, was separately nominated for the National Register in mid-2006 and was listed on October 25, 2006.

Geography

Neighborhood boundaries

According to the Silvermine Community Association, the northern boundary of the neighborhood is Huckleberry Hill Road in both Wilton and New Canaan. The neighborhood includes both sides of Thayer Drive and Wardwell Drive in New Canaan, Silvermine Road and the streets off it, east of the intersection with Carter Street and Canoe Hill Road. Carter Street is not in the neighborhood, but all of the streets east of it are.

In Norwalk, the neighborhood includes a bit of New Canaan Avenue near the New Canaan line and Purdy Road, Comstock Hill Avenue and streets off it, Silvermine Avenue just north of its intersection with Bartlett Avenue, Cliffview Drive, James Street and Riverview Drive, Perry Avenue north and west of Route 7 and North Seir Hill Road, south of its intersection with Vespucci Road, which is also in the neighborhood.

In Wilton, the neighborhood includes both sides of Seir Hill Road north to its intersection with Old Boston Road, the west side of Old Boston Road to its intersection with Highfield Road, both sides of Old Boston Road north of that to its intersection with New Canaan Road, the west side of Old Boston Road north of that to Huckleberry Hill Road, and the south side of Huckleberry Hill Road in Wilton and New Canaan.

Notable people

 Faith Baldwin, a writer
 Solon Borglum, a sculptor, lived in New Canaan.
 William Boring, designer of Ellis Island and Columbia University dean of architecture, lived in the "Sun House". 
 D. Putnam Brinley, muralist and one of the organizers of the 1913 Armory Show. His residence in New Canaan, "Datchet House", was designed by fellow Silverminer Austin W. Lord.
 Edward Eager, a playwright, lyricist, and author of children's books, lived on Silvermine Road in New Canaan. 
 Johnny Gruelle, an artist and creator of Raggedy Ann, lived in Norwalk.
 Austin W. Lord, painter, fellow of the American Institute of Architects, and dean of the School of Architecture at Columbia University.
 Verneur Pratt, inventor of the microfilm reader, lived in the Keeler-Pratt House in the 1920s. His laboratory and studio was the 1876 carriage barn on the property.
 Carl Schmitt, a painter and poet, lived in Wilton) Many of his descendants still live in the Silvermine area.
 Marion Telva, a singer with New York's Metropolitan Opera, lived in the former residence of Johnny Gruelle.
 Spencer Tracy, the actor, was a frequent guest at the Silvermine Tavern.
 John Vassos, industrial designer and founding member of the Industrial Designers Society of America, and chief of the OSS "Spy School" in Cairo during World War II.
 Frank Buttery, a baseball player

In popular culture
 Faith Baldwin set six novels in a fictionalized version of Silvermine called "Little Oxford."
 Local author Edward Eager wrote two novels about children living in Silvermine: Magic or Not (1959) and The Well-Wishers (1960). In the books, there is a real silver mine.
 The 1998 movie The Object of My Affection starring Jennifer Aniston featured scenes in and around the property.

See also
National Register of Historic Places listings in Fairfield County, Connecticut

References

Further reading

 Prevost, Lisa (December 30, 2001) "If you're thinking of living in Silvermine, Conn.; Enclave Steeped in History and the Arts" The New York Times
 Prevost, Lisa (August 26, 2015) "Silvermine, Conn., An Enclave Attached to Its Past" The New York Times

Geography of Norwalk, Connecticut
New Canaan, Connecticut
Wilton, Connecticut
Neighborhoods in Connecticut
Historic districts in Fairfield County, Connecticut
National Register of Historic Places in Fairfield County, Connecticut
Historic districts on the National Register of Historic Places in Connecticut